Gravina may refer to:

Places

Italy
Gravina di Catania, a municipality of the Province of Catania, Sicily
Gravina in Puglia, a town and municipality of the Province of Bari, Apulia
Gravina DOC, Italian wine region located around the town of Gravina
Gravina (river), a river in southern Italy
Roggiano Gravina, a municipality of the Province of Cosenza, Calabria

United States
Gravina Island, Alexander Archipelago, Alaska
Gravina Islands, Alexander Archipelago, Alaska

Other uses
 Gravina (clipper), a clipper ship built in Hoboken, New Jersey in 1853
 Spanish cruiser Gravina, a Spanish Navy cruiser of the late 19th century
 Duke of Gravina and the (Arch)ducal family of Orsini-Gravina
 Diocese of Gravina and Montepeloso

People with the surname 
Carla Gravina, Italian actress and politician
Cesare Gravina, Italian silent actor
Dominic Gravina, Italian Dominican theologian
Dorothea Gravina, English mountain climber
Federico Carlos Gravina y Nápoli, Spanish Admiral during the American Revolution and Napoleonic Wars
Gabriele Gravina, Italian sports director
Giovanni Vincenzo Gravina, Italian jurist and littérateur 
John of Gravina, Prince of Achaea
Pasquale Gravina, Italian volleyball player
Vanessa Gravina, Italian actress

See also